Brezovica pri Gradinu is a small settlement in the City Municipality of Koper in the Littoral region of Slovenia close to the Croatian border.

Name
The name of the settlement was changed from Brezovica to Brezovica pri Gradinu in 1959.

History
In 1954, when the Free Territory of Trieste was dissolved and Zone B was assigned to Yugoslavia, Brezovica pri Gradinu (together with Abitanti, Belvedur, Gradin, Koromači–Boškini, Močunigi, Pregara, and Sirči) was originally assigned to the Socialist Republic of Croatia. In 1956 these villages were reassigned to the Socialist Republic of Slovenia.

References

External links
Brezovica pri Gradinu on Geopedia

Populated places in the City Municipality of Koper